The Kingdom of Ormond (Modern Irish:  - "East Munster") was a short-lived kingdom in medieval Ireland. It existed in 12th century AD, comprising the eastern part of Munster, in what is now County Tipperary, with parts of County Kilkenny and County Waterford.

The kingdom was formed from a partition of the preceding Kingdom of Munster. It was a fief of the O'Kennedy family, but was soon conquered by the Anglo-Normans, who created the Earldom of Ormond as part of the Lordship of Ireland, under the suzerainty of the Butler family. However, the O'Kennedys, now styled "Lords of Ormond", long struggled with the Butlers for control of the region. In 1336 a peace treaty was signed between the two families, but in 1347 the O'Kennedys were able to drive out the Butlers from Nenagh Castle and install there, keeping the manor for more than two hundred years.

Two modern Irish baronies, Ormond Upper and Ormond Lower, are named after the kingdom.

Kings of Ormond
 Olaf Húa Cennétig (...-1164)
 Domnall Húa Ceinneidig (...-1181)
 Brian O Cennetig
 Tomas O Cennetig, half-king of Ormond

References

History of County Tipperary
Geography of County Tipperary
Geographic history of Ireland
Kingdoms of medieval Ireland